The University of Saskatchewan Physical Activity Complex (PAC) is a multipurpose facility on the University of Saskatchewan campus. It opened on August 25, 2003.  It has three full gymnasiums, three basketball, three volleyball, and four squash & racquetball courts. It hosts the University of Saskatchewan Basketball team on a court with a maximum capacity of 2426.

See also
University of Saskatchewan Kinesiology
(University of Saskatchewan)

References

2003 establishments in Saskatchewan
Physical Activity Complex
University and college buildings completed in 2003
University sports venues in Canada